Ent-isokaurene C2-hydroxylase (CYP71Z6) is an enzyme with systematic name ent-isokaurene,NADPH:oxygen oxidoreductase (hydroxylating). This enzyme catalyses the following chemical reaction

 ent-isokaurene + O2 + NADPH + H+  ent-2alpha-hydroxyisokaurene + H2O + NADP+

Ent-isokaurene C2-hydroxylase performs the initial step in the conversion of ent-isokaurene to the antibacterial oryzalides in rice, Oryza sativa.

References

External links 
 

EC 1.14.13